Vicious is Nasty Idols third album release after 1991's Cruel Intention. The album was re-released in 2002 as the band's original label (HSM) had gone bankrupt in 1994.

Track listing

Bonus tracks
"Hurt Me" -Only on 2002 reissue-
"Forest Of Cries" -Only on 2002 reissue-

Personnel
 Andy Pierce - Vocals
 Peter Espinoza - Lead Guitar
 Dick Qwarfort - Bass
 Stanley - Drums

References

1993 albums
Nasty Idols albums